Maddy Coy is the deputy director of the Child and Woman Abuse Studies Unit (CWASU), London Metropolitan University and has collaborated with the End Violence Against Women Coalition (EVAW).

Career 
Prior to becoming a researcher, Coy worked for several years with sexually exploited girls and women. She has published a number of articles and book chapters on the sex industry, including links between local authority care and sexual exploitation, women's experiences of selling sex and men's motivations for buying sex. More recently Coy has focused on developing a gendered analysis of sexualised popular culture, including how this might be addressed in popular approaches and everyday practice with young people.

Bibliography

Books

Chapters in books

Journal articles 
 
 
 
 
 
  Pdf. First published online 21 October 2010.

Papers

For the CWASU 
  Pdf.
 
  Pdf.
  Pdf.
  Pdf.
  Pdf. A report commissioned for the Office of the Children's Commissioner's Inquiry into Child Sexual Exploitation in Gangs and Groups.

For EVAW 
   Pdf.
   Pdf.

References

External links 
 Profile page: Maddy Coy London Metropolitan University

Academics of London Metropolitan University
British charity and campaign group workers
British educational theorists
Date of birth missing (living people)
Living people
Place of birth missing (living people)
Women's studies academics
Year of birth missing (living people)